The 1969–70 Montenegrin Republic League was 25th season of Montenegrin Republic League. Season started in August 1969 and finished in May 1970.

Season 

On season 1969–70, in Montenegrin Republic League participated 12 teams. Among the teams which didn't play during the previous season were Čelik (relegated from previous season and best teams from Regional leagues - Jezero and Muo.
After 22 weeks, the title won Iskra, with only one point more than Bokelj. With that result, Iskra gained a promotion to Yugoslav Second League. Three lowest ranked teams - Jezero, Crvena Stijena and Muo were relegated to Regional leagues (fourth level).

Table

Higher leagues 
On season 1969–70, six Montenegrin teams played in higher leagues of SFR Yugoslavia. All of them (Budućnost, Sutjeska, Lovćen, OFK Titograd, Tara Zabjelo and Jedinstvo) participated in 1969–70 Yugoslav Second League.

See also 
 Montenegrin Republic League
Montenegrin Republic Cup (1947–2006)
Montenegrin clubs in Yugoslav football competitions (1946–2006)
Montenegrin Football Championship (1922–1940)

References 

Montenegrin Republic League